The spotfin hogfish or Cuban hogfish (Bodianus pulchellus) is a species of wrasse native to the Atlantic Ocean, where it is mainly found from North Carolina, United States, through the Caribbean to Brazil. It has also been recorded from São Tomé off the coast of Africa. It is of minor importance to local commercial fisheries and can be found in the aquarium trade.

References

External links
 

spotfin hogfish
Fish of the Western Atlantic
Fish of the Caribbean
 Labridae
Fish of Cuba
Fish of the Dominican Republic
Taxa named by Felipe Poey
spotfin hogfish